...Very 'Eavy ...Very 'Umble is the debut studio album by British rock band Uriah Heep.

Release
The album was released on 13 June 1970 by Vertigo Records in the UK. The original vinyl release was a gatefold sleeve, featuring frontman David Byron on the front sleeve, almost unrecognisable beneath cobwebs.

It was issued in August 1970 by Mercury Records in the United States as just Uriah Heep with different sleeve artwork (a centipede type monster), and with the track "Bird of Prey" in place of "Lucy Blues". The album was reissued by Bronze Records in 1971 after the band signed to that label.

The album shows the band trying out various genres a mix of heavy metal and progressive rock rather than the hard rock that they would become known for on later albums. Tracks 3 and 8 were recorded as Spice songs prior to the band's renaming as Uriah Heep, and featured session player Colin Wood on keyboards. When Ken Hensley joined Spice in early 1970, the tracks were not re-recorded.

Reception
The album was generally panned by the mainstream critical press upon its release, although it has since been acknowledged as an early classic of the heavy metal genre. Canadian music critic Martin Popoff classifies the album as "proto-heavy metal". Rolling Stone magazine's Melissa Mills began her review by saying, "If this group makes it I'll have to commit suicide. From the first note you know you don't want to hear any more."

Track listings

US release

This remastered CD added three bonus tracks and extensive liner notes:
The bonus single edit of "Gypsy" was released for the Best of Uriah Heep (1991 CD) and then remastered for Rarities from the Bronze Age (1995 CD).
The two other bonus tracks were originally recorded in 1969 by the band Spice, just prior to Ken Hensley joining the band.

Personnel
Uriah Heep
 David Byron – lead vocals
 Mick Box – lead guitar, acoustic guitar, backing vocals
 Paul Newton – bass guitar, backing vocals
 Ken Hensley – organ, slide guitar, Mellotron, piano, backing vocals
 Nigel Olsson – drums on "Lucy Blues" and "Dreammare"

Former musicians
 Alex Napier – drums (all except "Lucy Blues", "Dreammare" and "Bird of Prey")
 Colin Wood – keyboard on "Come Away Melinda" and "Wake Up (Set Your Sights)"
 Keith Baker – drums on "Bird of Prey"

Production
 Gerry Bron – producer
 Peter Gallen – engineer, mixing
 Peter Olliff – mixing

Charts

References

Uriah Heep (band) albums
1970 debut albums
Albums produced by Gerry Bron
Vertigo Records albums
Mercury Records albums
Bronze Records albums